A purr is a sound in cat communication.

Purr may also refer to:

Purr (Pillow Pal), a Pillow Pal tiger made by Ty, Inc.
Purr (fragrance), a fragrance by Katy Perry
PURRR, a fictional organization [P.U.R.R.R. - Philanthropic Union for Rescue, Relief and Recuperation of Cats] in "The Hidden Tiger" episode of The Avengers (TV series)
Purring, an alternative name for the combat sport of Shin-kicking

See also
Per (disambiguation)
Perr (disambiguation)